Big Grove Township is a township in Johnson County, Iowa, USA.

History
Big Grove Township was organized in 1845.

References

Townships in Johnson County, Iowa
Townships in Iowa
Populated places established in 1845
1845 establishments in Iowa Territory